The Roman Catholic Diocese of Klerksdorp is a diocese located in the city of Klerksdorp in the Ecclesiastical province of Johannesburg in South Africa.

The second bishop of Klerksdorp was His Lordship, the Right Reverend Bishop Zithulele Patrick Mvemve, former auxiliary bishop of Johannesburg (while serving there, he was the Titular Bishop of Luperciana). On Friday, April 26, 2013, Pope Francis accepted Bishop Mvemve's resignation as Bishop, under Canon 401.2 of the Latin rite 1983 Code of Canon Law. Pope Francis then appointed Johannesburg's archbishop, Buti Joseph Tlhagale, O.M.I., as Apostolic Administrator until the third bishop was named.

History
 October 14, 1965: Established as Apostolic Prefecture of Western Transvaal from the Diocese of Johannesburg
 February 27, 1978: Promoted as Diocese of Klerksdorp

Leadership
 Prefect Apostolic of Western Transvaal (Roman rite) 
 Fr. Daniel Alphonse Omer Verstraete, O.M.I. (1965.11.09 – 1978.02.27 see below)
 Bishops of Klerksdorp (Roman rite)
 Bishop Daniel Alphonse Omer Verstraete, O.M.I. (see above 1978.02.27 – 1994.03.26)
 Bishop Zithulele Patrick Mvemve (1994.03.26 - 2013.04.26)
 Bishop Victor Hlolo Phalana (2015.01.25 - present day)

See also
Klerksdorp Diocese Official Website
Roman Catholicism in South Africa

References
 GCatholic.org
 Catholic Hierarchy

Roman Catholic dioceses in South Africa
Christian organizations established in 1910
Roman Catholic dioceses and prelatures established in the 20th century
Roman Catholic Ecclesiastical Province of Johannesburg